Eupithecia xanthomixta is a moth in the family Geometridae. It is found in Afghanistan and Iran.

Subspecies
Eupithecia xanthomixta xanthomixta
Eupithecia xanthomixta derbendi Vojnits, 1988 (Iran)

References

Moths described in 1988
xanthomixta
Moths of Asia